Seyed Mohammad Panjali Qomi (born July 26, 1955 in Tehran, Iran) is a retired Iranian footballer and a football coach. He played for Bargh Tehran, Fath Tehran, Aboomoslem, Persepolis FC, Al-Gharafa and the Iran national football team, where he made 45 appearances. He usually played in the defender position. He was also team manager of Persepolis from 1993 until 1994.

Honours

Club 
Persepolis
Espandi Cup: 1979
Asian Cup Winners' Cup (1): 1990–91
Runner-up: 1992–93
Hazfi Cup (1): 1991–92
Tehran Provincial League (4): 1982-83, 1986–87, 1989–90, 1990-91

Country 
Iran
Asian Games Gold Medal (1): 1990

References

External Links

1955 births
Living people
Iranian footballers
Iran international footballers
Association football defenders
Persepolis F.C. players
F.C. Aboomoslem players
1980 AFC Asian Cup players
1984 AFC Asian Cup players
Iranian football managers
People from Tehran
Iranian expatriate footballers
Persepolis F.C. managers
Asian Games gold medalists for Iran
Footballers at the 1986 Asian Games
Asian Games medalists in football
Footballers at the 1990 Asian Games
Persepolis F.C. non-playing staff
Medalists at the 1990 Asian Games